The DFSK K-Series (东风小康K系列) is a range of 5-door microvan, 2-door micro pickups, and 4-door micro pickups manufactured by DFSK Motor, a joint venture between Dongfeng Motor and Chongqing Sokon Industry.

First Generation
The first generation DFSK K-Series consists of a few different body styles, including a short wheelbase van, a long wheelbase van, a single cab pickup, and a double cab pickup. In some parts of the world, all models were sold as variants under the DFM Ministar name.

DFSK K05 and K07

The first generation vans were sold as the DFSK K05 and DFM K07 or Dongfeng Sokon K07 depending on the trim levels. 

Prices of the first generation K07 can range from 27,900 yuan to 36,900 yuan in China. An updated version named the K07 II was launched later but changes were minor.

DFSK K01
The DFSK K01, DFM K01, or Dongfeng Sokon K01 is the single cab pickup and single cab cutaway cab version of the DFSK K07 microvan, with everything before the B-pillars shared. Code named EQ1020TF, the K01 was sold from 2008.

DFSK K02
The DFSK K02, DFM K02, or Dongfeng Sokon K02 is the crew cab pickup version of the DFSK K07 microvan, with everything before the B-pillars shared. Codename EQ1021NF. Engines were installed: EQ465i2-20, EQ465i2-30 and EQ474i.

DFSK K06
The DFSK K06 is the passenger box truck version of the DFSK K07 microvan, with everything before the B-pillars shared. Dongfeng Sokon K06 — Cargo-passenger van for five persons with engine EQ474i, as well as options Ambulance & Police Car (Mini MPV). Сodename EQ6410LF.

DFSK Xin K07 (New K07, 2013-present)

Being the first major update of the K07 since the launch in 2005, the DFSK New K07 debuted in October 2013 as a single model 7-seater microvan that is aimed at the compact MPV market instead of the commercial vehicle market. The New K07 features hinged door for all 4 side doors instead of the sliding doors of the K07 launched in 2005, and was sold alongside the 2005-launched model instead of replacing the model.

Second Generation

DFSK K05S and K07S

Just like the first generation DFSK K-Series, the DFSK K05S and K07S names were used depending on the trim levels. In China, prices of the K05S ranges from 28,900 yuan to 30,900 yuan, while prices of the K07S ranges from 28,900 yuan to 32,900 yuan.

Pickup variants (DFSK K01, K02 and K02L)
The second generation K-Series pickups feature a different front fascia while the door panels and front fenders are still shared with the microvan models.

DFSK K01 and K05
The DFSK K01 is the single cab pickup version of the DFSK K07S microvan, with everything before the B-pillars shared. The K05 is the sealed box truck variant sharing the same cab.

DFSK K02 and K02L
The DFSK K02 and K02L is the crew cab pickup version of the DFSK K07S microvan, with everything before the B-pillars shared. Electric variants are also offered overseas.

Oversea market variants
Restyled K01 models are sometimes sold as the Sokon Fulwin (稳发 in Taiwan) or rebadged as the Giotti Victoria Gladiator in foreign markets.

References

External links
 

Spare parts for DFSK Sokon

2010s cars
Cars introduced in 2005
Cars of China
Microvans
Minivans